Jiřina Žertová, née Rejholcová (born 13 August 1932) is a Czech sculptor, painter, glass and art-industrial artist.

Life 
Jiřina Žertová comes from a family of  Josef Rejholec, an official of the Supreme State Audit Office in Prague. From 1947 to 1950 she studied at the State Graphic Arts School under Prof. Zdeněk Balaš. In 1949, the school was renamed Higher School of Art Industry, where she studied in the studio of Petr Dillinger. Her classmate and friend was Zdena Strobachová, and her older colleagues were Adriena Šimotová or Jiří John.

Already after her third year of graphic design school, she passed the exam for the Academy of Arts, Architecture and Design in Prague, where she was admitted in 1950, shortly after the February Communist coup and at a time of severe political persecution. Despite this, Professor Josef Kaplický managed to maintain a liberal and creative atmosphere in the studio.  A group of students gathered here (René Roubíček, Stanislav Libenský, Václav Cigler, Vladimír Kopecký, Vratislav Šotola, Stanislav Oliva, Rudolf Volráb, etc.), who were interested in modern painting and graphics and could apply their ideas in work with etched and painted glass. At that time, magazines such as Cahiers d'Art were still available in the Museum of Decorative Arts library, where it was possible to get acquainted with modern French art. Jiřina Žertová finished her studies in 1955 with a design for a monumental stained glass panel with a horse motif. She managed to obtain a scholarship from the Union of Czechoslovak Artists and the following year she worked at the Glass Centre on designs for utility glass intended for industrial production.

She married the geologist Bedřich Žert, with whom she has a daughter Pavlína (* 1956) and a son Jan (* 1959). Since 1956 she has worked as an independent artist and has been working freelance. She was one of the most successful graduates of Josef Kaplický's studio and her glass designs were regularly exhibited at Czech glass shows. She has been exhibiting independently since 1973 (Vienna). In 1989 she had a solo exhibition at the Heller Gallery, New York and Nakama Gallery, Tokyo, in 1992 in Miller Gallery, New York.

She collaborated externally with Bohemia Glassworks in Poděbrady and designed blown and engraved glass for Škrdlovice Glassworks. The glassworks was nationalised and fell under the Directorate of Arts and Crafts, but the original owners worked here as master glassmakers from the 1950s onwards and also realised very demanding designs by glass artists. The possibilities of author's work in Škrdlovice changed radically after 1967, when František Vízner and Dana Vachtová came to the management as designers. Žertová and Vachtová also began to use the sampling hours offered to artists by Crystalex in Nový Bor. Jiřina Žertová's glass objects were realized by glass masters František Danielka, Josef Rozínek (Nový Bor glassworks) or Josef Kučera (Chřibská glassworks).

Since 2007 she has been a member of Mánes Union of Fine Arts.

Awards 
 1957 XI. Trienale di Milano, Silver Medal
 2004 International Exhibition of Glass Kanaza

Work 
Jiřina Žertová is one of the glass artists who, in the context of Czech studio glass art, are most prominent in the field of painted glass.

During her studies, she focused mainly on painting and for the first three years on cut glass during her internship at the Moser glassworks in Karlovy Vary. After graduating, she drew designs for Bohemia Glassworks in Poděbrady, which worked with lead cut glass. She won her first international award for a set of cut glass in 1957. In the 1950s, glass allowed much more creative freedom than other disciplines where socialist realism dominated.

Her creative career in working with glass developed in the 1960s, when she had the opportunity to realize designs for cast glass in the Škrdlovice glassworks. Already the first works by Jiřina Žertová were carried in the spirit of unconventional solutions and retained the distinctive qualities of abstract artistic expression. She uses colour as a meaning forming element, but her objects, when inspired by nature, are based primarily on the possibilities and specifics of the glass itself. She also made her first larger objects of blown glass here, but she discovered new creative possibilities only after moving to the Borské sklo (later Crystalex) glasworks, where she was invited by František Danielka.

At the beginning of the author's truly original glass work in the second half of the 1970s was blown glass. The rotational principle of shaping the glass while blowing it into a wooden mould influenced her work towards strictly geometric shapes, which she combined to emphasise the mutual tension and dynamics of the inner space. Initially, the driving force behind her creativity was the sheer thrill of forming a dimensional bubble, which resulted in a fascinating object. Interventions in it were limited to bending or simply denting the smoothly stretched shape. She was interested in the artistic design of interior space and designed technically demanding blown objects with embedded elements. However, Jiřina Žertová soon abandoned the sleekness of the form and imprinted various objects on glass. She also began to use blowing into increasingly complex wooden and plaster moulds, which her husband Bedřich Žert helped her to make. Contrary to the previous workshop practice, she also left the so-called "kicks" - the edges of the glass mass protruding outside the mould - as part of the objects. These gave the elementally expanding mass a new dramatic expression in the modelling of shapes and in the structures of the surfaces. She combined the harmony of the curves of the blown shapes with the treatment of their walls with a decoration of bubbles along with bold "painterly strokes" of strands of coloured glass.

Jiřina Žertová could not completely control the colour of her objects when working in the glassworks and worked partly with the element of randomness. Therefore, in the 1980s, the artist emphasised the starkness of the shaping by expressive gestural painting interventions, the form of which eventually settled on a cast linear structure, enveloping the glass form in a colourful tangle and affecting the base as well. The transformation of stimuli from concrete reality was not a fundamentally determining moment in their creation. They arose freely, in the preoccupation with the creative thinking itself about the modelling of masses of glass form with light, about the interaction of sculptural forms with colour accents as an element of a different artistic language. The culmination and the turning point in this series was the object Don't Ask Where We're Going from 1990.

In the early 1990s, Jiřina Žertová felt that she had exhausted her creative possibilities in blown objects. The cooperation with the glassworks also became complicated during privatisation and with the arrival of new owners. She found absolute freedom of creativity and independence in the application of the principle of layering painted flat glass. The form of the artist's works is less dramatic in external form. The seemingly immaterial prisms of layered panels do not expand into space, they enclose themselves. The glass has become a building element, a carrier of the painted colour structure, a mediator of the visual variability of the whole object. In its enclosed interior space, a volatile game is unfolding with colour and light variability, with the illusion of the tangible, with spatial magic, with the distortion of the logic of the object's construction by the reflections of mirrors. Although it is again possible to see similarities with reality in the works, the connection is generally symbolic. The often large-scale works can thus be approached primarily as a generous offer of an experience of an impressive play with multiplicity, with colour and structure, with something seen and yet elusive. As the horizon shifts, illusory shapes and bodies appear and disappear again, lending the compositions the character of a mobile object. This layering of flat glass in conjunction with gestural abstract painting has shifted the painting from defined spatial shapes to the third dimension and makes Jiřina Žertová's works unique even on an international scale.

In the decade after 2011, Jiřina Žertová began to work with compositions oriented towards height, where she managed to dynamise and undulate some objects by deviating them from the axis. Objects composed of plate glass offer a range of visual effects - shapes can blend into each other, as well as shift in and out of view, and coloured painted surfaces seen in the foreground are added to those reflected by mirrors. In this way, the artist has created a large number of charismatic works - complex spatial objects composed of flat glass. The layers feature a rich swirl of colour structures, but also monochrome black or red lines combined with flat areas (Babylon, 2012). In the objects created after 2013, she has also resolved the coherence of vertically arranged glasses and created several objects in which austere geometric shapes are applied. 
 
In the authenticity of her artistic handwriting, Jiřina Žertová is still one of the most prominent figures of contemporary studio glass in the Czech Republic, and her works have a recognised position in the international context.

Design 
Jiřina Žertová is the author of drinking glass, metallurgical glass shaped from free hand and designs of decors of cut lead glass. She is also the author of several designs for architecture.

Representation in collections 
 Centre Pompidou, Paříž 
 Musée des Arts Décoratifs de la Ville, Lausanne
 The Corning Museum of Glass, New York
 Jacques Baruch Gallery, Chicago
 The Lannan Foundation of Contemporary Arts, Palm Beach
 Museum of Science and Industry, Los Angeles
 Kunstsammlungen der Veste, Coburg
 Kunstmuseum Düsseldorf
 Museum für Kunst und Gewerbe Hamburg
 Glasmuseum Ebeltoft
 Kunstforum Göhrde
 Steinberg Foundation, Kunstmuseum Liechtenstein
 Muzeum Narodowe, Wroclaw
 Museum of Decorative Arts in Prague
 Moravian Gallery in Brno
 North Bohemian Museum in Liberec
 East Bohemian Museum in Pardubice
 Museum of Glass and Jewellery in Jablonec nad Nisou
 Crystalex Nový Bor

Exhibitions

Solo 
 1973 Galerie Lobmeyer, Vienna
 1975 North Bohemian Museum, Liberec
 1982 Gallery Rob van den Doel, Gravenhage, Netherlands
 1984, 1987 Galerie Centrum, Prague
 1989 Heller Gallery, New York, Gallery Nakama, Tokyo
 1990 Galerie Gottschalk-Betz, Frankfurt am Main, Clara Scremini Gallery, Paris, Galerie Sanske, Zürich
 1992 Müller Gallery, New York, Silica gallery, Beverly Hills, Ca., USA
 1994 The House at Jonáš, East Bohemia Gallery in Pardubice
 1998 Bender-Boehringer - Zentrum, Vienna
 1999 Gallery of Fine Arts in Ostrava
 2001 Gallery of Fine Arts Znojmo
 2005 Glasgalerie Hittfeld, Hamburg
 2006 Leo Kaplan Modern, New York
 2008 Galerie Aspekt, Brno
 2013 Jiřina Žertová, Vladimír Kopecký: Convergence, East Bohemia Gallery Pardubice
 2014 Nová síň Gallery, Prague
 2017 Špilberk Gallery, Brno

Collective (selection) 
 1984 Modern Czechoslovak Glass Sculptures, Copenhagen, Contemporary Glass in Europe, Strasbourg
 1985 Coburger Glaspreis, Coburg, Glassymposium Süssmuth
 1986 Contemporary Czech Glass, London, Birmingham, Modern International Glass Art, Ebeltoft, DK, Tchechoslowakisch Glas in Austria, Wien, Salzburg
 1987 Vidre D art, Asuntament de Barcelona, Czech Cultural Centre Warszawa, Wien
 1988 Artistes Verries de Tchécoslovaquie, Bruxelles, Kopecký + Freunde, Frankfurt am Main
 1989 Contemporary European Crystal and Glass Sculptures, Liége, 18 Verriers Tcheque aux Musée Suisse du Vitrail, Romont, Verres de Boheme, Musée des Arts Décoratifs, Paris, Verriers Tcheque aux Centre International du Vitrail, Chartres
 1990 International Exhibition of Glass, Kanazawa, Japan, Neues Glas in Europa, Düsseldorf
 1991 Configura, Kunst in Europe, Erfurt, Prague Glas Prize, Mánes, Praha
 1992 Prague Glass Prize, Heller Gallery, New York
 1993 Bohemia Crystal, Segovia
 1994 Glass of the 20th century, Museum of East Bohemia in Pardubice, Prager Glaskunst, Bamberg
 1996 International Glass Exhibition, Palazzo Ducale, Venezia
 1997 Glaskunst aus Tchechien, Wien
 1999 Exhibition: Czech Glass, China
 2000 Light - Transfigured, Hida Takayama Museum of Art, Gifu, Japan, Euro - Fire in the Land of Liége
 2001 Sensitive Touch, Studio Glass Gallery, London
 2001-2011 Verrailes, Galerie Internationale du Verre, Biot, France
 2003, 2006, 2012 International Glass Symposium, Crystalex, Nový Bor
 2004 International Exhibition of Glass, Kanazawa, Japan, Leo Kaplan Modern, New York
 2005 Expo 2005, Aichi, Japan
 2007 Czech Glass / 1945-1980 (Creation in the Age of Misery and Illusion), National Gallery in Prague
 2009 Crossing borders, Glasmuseet Ebeltoft, Glass Friends in Contemporary Glass Sculpture, Litvak gallery, Tel Aviv, Mánes Union of Fine Arts (1887 - 2009) , Berlin, Bratislava
 2010 New Sensitivity, National Art Museum of China, Beijing, Mánes Union of Fine Arts, Diamant Gallery, Prague
 2011 Freedom to Create, Litvak Gallery, Tel Aviv
 2012 Jubilants of Mánes, Diamant Gallery, Prague
 2012/13 Happy Birthday! Czech Glass Art, Museum of Decorative Arts in Prague
 2018/2019 Two in One: Czech and Slovak Glass Design 1918-2018, Museum of Glass and Jewellery in Jablonec nad Nisou
 2019/2020 Melting Edge, Portheimka Museum of Glass, Prague
 2020 S.V.U. Mánes, Rabas Gallery, Nová síň pod Vysokou bránou, Rakovník
 2021 Generation S.V.U. Mánes, St. Anne's Church, Jablonec nad Nisou

References

Sources 
 monographs
 Klára Jirková (ed.), Jiřina Žertová: Not Only Glass, 242 p., nakl. KAVKA, Prague 2022, ISBN 978-80-90-908575-0-6 
 catalogues
 Stehlík František, Jiřina Žertová: Glass Definitions, cat. 24 p., North Bohemian Museum Liberec 1975
 Jiřina Žertová: Glass, author unknown, cat. 6 p., ČFVU Dílo, Prague 1987
 Křen Ivo, Jiřina Žertová, cat. 16 p., Gallery of Fine Arts in Ostrava 2000
 Rossini Pavla, Jiřina Žertová: Selected works 1979-2012, cat. 54 p., English, private print, also Neues Glass 2012 
 Křen Ivo, Bouček Vít, Convergence: Jiřina Žertová, Vladimír Kopecký, East Bohemian Museum in Pardubice 2013, ISBN 978-80-85112-74-0 
 collective publications
 Šindelář Dušan, Contemporary Art Glass in Czechoslovakia, 112 p., Obelisk, Prague, 1970
 Adlerová Kudělková Königová Alena, Contemporary Glass, 71 p., Odeon, Prague, 1979 (English edition)
 Ricke Helmut, Neues Glas in Europa. 50 Künstler, 50 Konzepte, Düsseldorf 1990
 Langhamer Antonín, Legenda o českém skle / The Legend of Bohemian Glass / Legende vom böhmischen Glas, 292 p., TIGRIS spol. s r. o., Zlín, 1999, 
 Petrová Sylva, Czech Glass, 283 p., (awarded as the most beautiful book of 2001), Gallery, Prague, 2001, 
 Křen Ivo, Permanent Exhibition of Czech Glass, East Bohemian Museum in Pardubice 2006, ISBN 80-86046-91-5
 articles
 Kohoutová Marie, On first and second place - and also on missed chances and changes in the passage of time with Jiřina Žertová, Glassrevue 16, 2003, pp. 3–4 
 encyclopedia
 New Encyclopedia of Czech Visual Art, ed. Horová Anděla, Academia Praha, 1995, 
 Dictionary of Czech and Slovak Visual Artists, ed. Malá Alena, Chagall Art Centre, Ostrava, 2010,

External links 

 The Work of Jiřina Žertová
 Information system abART: Žertová Jiřina
  Diamant exhibition, ČRO Vltava, 2014
 (min.17,40- 23,20) exhibition Nová síň, ČRO Vltava, 2014
 Litvak Gallery: Jiřina Žertová 
 Ivo Křen, Glass by Jiřina Žertová, Sanquis 2001, no. 16, p. 48

Living people
Czech artists
1932 births
Artists from Prague
Women glass artists
Czech glass artists
Academy of Arts, Architecture and Design in Prague alumni